The 2003–2004 Sparta Rotterdam season was the second football year in which the in 1888 formed club from Rotterdam had to play in the Dutch Second League. In the 2001–2002 season the team relegated for the first time in history by ending up in 17th place in the Eredivisie, and fourth in the play-offs for promotion and relegation ("nacompetitie"). Former Sparta defender Mike Snoei was the successor of Chris Dekker as Sparta's manager.

Matches

Eerste Divisie

Nacompetitie

Amstel Cup

Players

|-
|}

See also
2003–04 in Dutch football

External links
RSSSF
Voetbal International
footballdatabase

Sparta Rotterdam seasons
Sparta Rotterdam